Lucy Walker may refer to:
 Lucy Walker (director), British film director
 Lucy Walker (climber) (1836–1916), British mountaineer
 Lucy Walker (Latter Day Saint), wife of Joseph Smith
 Lucy Walker (writer) (1907–1987), Australian writer

Incidents 
 Lucy Walker steamboat disaster

Walker, Lucy